Naoya Sakamoto (born 29 June 1988) is a Japanese male sprint canoeist.  He was born in Tanabe, Wakayama.

At the 2012 Summer Olympics, he competed in the Men's C-1 200 metres.

At 2014 Asian Games he won a silver medal in the men's C-1 200 m event.

References

1988 births
Living people
Japanese male canoeists
Olympic canoeists of Japan
People from Tanabe, Wakayama
Sportspeople from Wakayama Prefecture
Canoeists at the 2012 Summer Olympics
Asian Games medalists in canoeing
Canoeists at the 2010 Asian Games
Canoeists at the 2014 Asian Games
Asian Games silver medalists for Japan
Asian Games bronze medalists for Japan
Medalists at the 2010 Asian Games
Medalists at the 2014 Asian Games